The following were the scheduled events of association football for the year 2016 throughout the world.

Events

Men's national teams

AFC 
 2–15 November: 2016 AFC Solidarity Cup in the 
 : 
 : 
 : 
 4th: 

CONMEBOL 
 3–26 June: Copa América Centenario in the 
 : 
 : 
 : 
 4th:

OFC 
 28 May - 11 June: 2016 OFC Nations Cup in 
 : 
 : 
 :  and

UEFA 
 : 
 : 
 :  and

Youth (men)

AFC 
 12–30 January: 2016 AFC U-23 Championship in 
 : 
 : 
 : 
 4th: 
 10–23 July: 2016 AFF U-16 Youth Championship in 
 : 
 : 
 : 
 4th: 
 11–24 September: 2016 AFF U-19 Youth Championship in 
 : 
 : 
 : 
 15 September–2 October: 2016 AFC U-16 Championship in 
 : 
 : 
 :  and 
 13–30 October: 2016 AFC U-19 Championship in 
 : 
 : 
 :  and

OFC 
 2–16 September: 2016 OFC U-20 Championship in 
 : 
 : 
 :  and

UEFA 
 5–21 May: 2016 UEFA European Under-17 Championship in 
 : 
 : 
 : 
 4th: 
 11–24 July: 2016 UEFA European Under-19 Championship in 
 : 
 :

Women's national teams 
 July 26 – August 4: 2016 AFF Women's Championship in  Mandalay
 : 
 : 
 : 
 19 November – 3 December: 2016 Africa Women Cup of Nations in 
 : 
 : 
 : 
 4th:

Youth (women) 
 4–16 May: 2016 UEFA Women's Under-17 Championship in 
 : 
 : 
 : 
 4th: 
 19–31 July: 2016 UEFA Women's Under-19 Championship in 
 : 
 : 
 :  and 
 30 September–21 October: 2016 FIFA U-17 Women's World Cup in 
 : 
 : 
 : 
 4th: 
 13 November–3 December: 2016 FIFA U-20 Women's World Cup in  Port Moresby
 : 
 : 
 : 
 4th:

Multi-sports events

Men 
 3–19 August: Football at the 2016 Summer Olympics – Men's tournament in Rio de Janeiro, 
 : 
 : 
 :  
 4th:

Women 
 3–19 August: Football at the 2016 Summer Olympics – Women's tournament in Rio de Janeiro, 
 : 
 : 
 : 
 4th:

Fixed dates for national team matches 
Scheduled international matches per their International Match Calendar. Also known as FIFA International Day/Date(s).
21–29 March
30 May – 7 June (non-UEFA confederations)
29 August – 5 September
3–11 October
7–15 November

Club continental champions

Men

Women

Domestic leagues

UEFA nations

Men 

Notes

Women

Notes

CONMEBOL nations

CONCACAF nations

Men

Women

AFC nations

Men

Women

CAF nations

OFC nations

Domestic cups

UEFA nations

Men 

Notes

Women

CONMEBOL nations

CONCACAF nations

AFC nations

CAF nations

OFC nations

Detailed results

2016 Summer Olympics (FIFA)
 August 3 – 20: 2016 Summer Olympics in  Rio de Janeiro (finals takes place at Maracanã Stadium)
 Men:  ;  ;  
 Women:  ;  ;

2016 FIFA tournaments
 September 30 – October 21: 2016 FIFA U-17 Women's World Cup in 
  defeated , 5–4 in penalties and after a 0–0 in regular play, to win their second FIFA U-17 Women's World Cup title. 
  took third place.
 November 13 – December 3: 2016 FIFA U-20 Women's World Cup in 
  defeated , 3–1, to win their second FIFA U-20 Women's World Cup title.
  took third place.
 December 8 – 18: 2016 FIFA Club World Cup in 
  Real Madrid defeated  Kashima Antlers, 4–2 in extra time, to win their second FIFA Club World Cup title.
  Atlético Nacional took third place.

UEFA
 June 30, 2015 – May 18, 2016: 2015–16 UEFA Europa League (final at  St. Jakob-Park, Basel)
  Sevilla FC defeated  Liverpool F.C., 3–1, to win their third consecutive and fifth overall UEFA Europa League title. 
 June 30, 2015 – May 28, 2016: 2015–16 UEFA Champions League (final at  San Siro, Milan)
  Real Madrid defeated fellow Spanish team, Atlético Madrid, 5–3 in penalties and after a 1–1 score in regular play, to win their 11th UEFA Champions League title.
 Real Madrid would represent UEFA at the 2016 FIFA Club World Cup.
 August 11, 2015 – May 26, 2016: 2015–16 UEFA Women's Champions League (final at  Mapei Stadium – Città del Tricolore, Reggio Emilia)
  Lyon defeated  Wolfsburg, 4–3 in penalties and after a 1–1 score in regular play, to win their third UEFA Women's Champions League title. 
 September 15, 2015 – April 18, 2016: 2015–16 UEFA Youth League (final at  Centre sportif de Colovray Nyon, Nyon)
  Chelsea defeated  Paris Saint-Germain, 2–1, to win their second consecutive UEFA Youth League title.
 May 4 – 16: 2016 UEFA Women's Under-17 Championship in 
  defeated , 3–2 in penalties and after a 0–0 score in regular play, to win their fifth UEFA Women's Under-17 Championship.  took third place.
 May 5 – 21: 2016 UEFA European Under-17 Championship in 
  defeated , 5–4 in penalties and after a 1–1 score in regular play, to win their sixth UEFA European Under-17 Championship title. 
  defeated , 1–0 in extra time, to win their first UEFA Euro Championship title. 
 July 11 – 24: 2016 UEFA European Under-19 Championship in 
  defeated , 4–0, to win their eighth UEFA European Under-19 Championship title.
 July 19 – 31: 2016 UEFA Women's Under-19 Championship in 
  defeated , 2–1, to win their fourth UEFA Women's Under-19 Championship title.
 August 9: 2016 UEFA Super Cup in  Lerkendal Stadion, Trondheim
  Real Madrid defeated fellow Spanish team, Sevilla FC, 3–2, to win their third UEFA Super Cup title.

CONMEBOL
 January 30 – February 14: 2016 U-20 Copa Libertadores in  Luque and Asunción
  São Paulo defeated  Liverpool, 1–0, to win their first U-20 Copa Libertadores title.  Cortuluá took third place.
 February 2 – July 27: 2016 Copa Libertadores
  Atlético Nacional defeated  Independiente del Valle, 2–1 on aggregate, to win their second Copa Libertadores title.
 Atlético Nacional would represent CONMEBOL at the 2016 FIFA Club World Cup
 March 1 – 20: 2016 South American Under-17 Women's Football Championship in  Barquisimeto
 Note: All the teams listed below qualified to compete in the 2016 FIFA U-17 Women's World Cup.
 Champions:  (second consecutive South American Under-17 Women's Football Championship title)
 Second: 
 Third: 
 June 3 – 26: Copa América Centenario in the 
  defeated , 4–2, after overtime and penalties, to win their second consecutive Copa América.  took third place.
 August 9 – December 7: 2016 Copa Sudamericana
 CONMEBOL has decided that team  Chapecoense would posthumously be the winners of the 2016 Copa Sudamericana title, following LaMia Flight 2933 disaster.
 August 10: 2016 Suruga Bank Championship in  Kashima, Ibaraki
  Santa Fe defeated  Kashima Antlers, 1–0, to win their first Suruga Bank Championship title. 
 August 18 & 25: 2016 Recopa Sudamericana
  River Plate defeated  Santa Fe, 2–1, to win their second consecutive Recopa Sudamericana title.
 December 6 – 20: 2016 Copa Libertadores Femenina in 
  Sportivo Limpeño defeated  Estudiantes de Guárico, 2–1, to win their first Copa Libertadores Femenina title. 
  Foz Cataratas took third place.

CAF
 November 27, 2015 – March 27, 2016: 2015–16 CAF U-17 Women's World Cup Qualifying Tournament
 January 16 – February 7: 2016 African Nations Championship in 
 The  defeated , 3–0, to win their second African Nations Championship title. The  took the bronze medal.
 February 12 – October 23: 2016 CAF Champions League
  Mamelodi Sundowns defeated  Zamalek, 3–1 on aggregate, to win their first CAF Champions League title.
 The Mamelodi Sundowns represented the CAF at the 2016 FIFA Club World Cup.
 February 12 – November 6: 2016 CAF Confederation Cup
  TP Mazembe defeated  MO Béjaïa, 5–2 on aggregate, to win their first CAF Confederation Cup title. 
 February 20: 2016 CAF Super Cup
  TP Mazembe defeated  Étoile Sportive du Sahel, 2–1, to win their third CAF Super Cup title.
 November 19 – December 3: 2016 Africa Women Cup of Nations in 
  defeated , 1–0, to win their second consecutive and tenth overall Africa Women Cup of Nations title.
  took third place.
 November 26 – December 3: 2016 UEMOA Tournament in  Lomé
  defeated , 1–0, to win their third UEMOA tournament title. 
 December 7 – 16: 2016 COSAFA U-20 Cup in  Rustenburg
  defeated , 2–1, to win their tenth COSAFA U-20 Cup title.  took third place.

AFC
 August 11, 2015 – November 5, 2016: 2016 AFC Cup
  Al-Quwa Al-Jawiya defeated  Bengaluru FC, 1–0, to win their first AFC Cup title. 
 January 12 – 30: 2016 AFC U-23 Championship in 
  defeated , 3–2, to win their first AFC U-23 Championship title.  took third place.
 February 29 – March 9: 2015–16 AFC Women's Olympic Qualifying Tournament (final) in  Osaka
  win the tournament. Australia and  qualified from 2016 Summer Olympics.
 January 27 – November 26: 2016 AFC Champions League
  Jeonbuk Hyundai Motors defeated  Al Ain FC, 3–2 in aggregate, to win their second AFC Champions League title.
 Jeonbuk Hyundai Motors would represent the AFC at the 2016 FIFA Club World Cup.
 July 10 – 23: 2016 AFF U-16 Youth Championship in  Phnom Penh
  defeated , 5–3 in penalties and after a 3–3 score in regular play, to win their second AFF U-16 Youth Championship title.
  took third place.
 July 26 – August 4: 2016 AFF Women's Championship in  Mandalay
  defeated , 6–5 in penalties and after a 1–1 score in regular play, to win their fourth AFF Women's Championship.
  took third place.
 September 11 – 24: 2016 AFF U-19 Youth Championship in  Hanoi
  defeated , 5–1, to win their fourth AFF U-19 Youth Championship title.
  took third place.
 September 15 – October 2: 2016 AFC U-16 Championship in 
  defeated , 4–3 in penalties and after a 0–0 score in regular play, to win their first AFC U-16 Championship title.
 October 13 – 30: 2016 AFC U-19 Championship in 
  defeated , 5–3 in penalties and after a 0–0 score in regular play, to win their first AFC U-19 Championship title.
 November 2 – 15: 2016 AFC Solidarity Cup in 
  defeated , 1–0, to win their first 2016 AFC Solidarity Cup title.  took third place.
  defeated , 3–2 on aggregate, to win their second consecutive and fifth overall AFF Championship title.

CONCACAF
 February 10 – 21: 2016 CONCACAF Women's Olympic Qualifying Championship in  Frisco and Houston
 The  defeated , 2–0, to win their fourth consecutive CONCACAF Women's Olympic Qualifying Tournament title.
 Note: The United States and Canada have qualified to compete at Rio 2016.
 August 4, 2015 – April 27, 2016: 2015–16 CONCACAF Champions League
  Club América defeated fellow Mexican team, Tigres UANL, 4–1 on aggregate, to win their second consecutive CONCACAF Champions League title. 
 Club América would represent CONCACAF at the 2016 FIFA Club World Cup.
 March 3 – 13: 2016 CONCACAF Women's U-17 Championship in 
 The  defeated , 2–1, to win their third CONCACAF Women's U-17 Championship title.  took third place.

OFC
 January 13 – 23: 2016 OFC U-17 Women's Championship in  Matavera
  defeated , 8–0, to win their third consecutive OFC U-17 Women's Championship title.  took third place.
 January 26 – April 23: 2016 OFC Champions League
  Auckland City FC defeated fellow New Zealand team, Team Wellington, 3–0, to win their seventh OFC Champions League title. 
 Auckland City would represent the OFC at the 2016 FIFA Club World Cup.
 May 28 – June 11: 2016 OFC Nations Cup in 
  defeated , 4–2 in penalties and after a 0–0 score in regular play, to win their fifth OFC Nations Cup title. 
 September 2 – 17: 2016 OFC U-20 Championship in  Port Vila
  defeated , 5–0, to win their sixth OFC U-20 Championship title.

Deaths

January

 3 January: Klaas Bakker, Dutch footballer (born 1926)
 4 January:
 Amby Fogarty, Irish international footballer (born 1933)
 Fernando Barrachina, Spanish international footballer (born 1947)
 John Roberts, Welsh international footballer (born 1946)
 5 January: Percy Freeman, English footballer (born 1945)
 7 January: Sergey Shustikov, Russian footballer (born 1970)
 9 January:
 Hamada Emam, Egyptian footballer (born 1943)
 Johnny Jordan, English footballer (born 1921)
 José María Rivas, Salvadorian international footballer (born 1958)
 10 January:
 Wim Bleijenberg, Dutch international footballer (born 1930)
 Teofil Codreanu, Romanian international footballer (born 1941)
 Kalevi Lehtovirta, Finnish footballer (born 1928)
 11 January: Reginaldo Araújo, Brazilian footballer (born 1977)
 12 January: Milorad Rajović, Serbian footballer (born 1955)
 15 January: Manuel Velázquez, Spanish international footballer (born 1943)
 17 January:
 Reza Ahadi, Iranian footballer (born 1962)
 John Taihuttu, Dutch footballer (born 1954)
 22 January: Homayoun Behzadi, Iranian footballer (born 1942)
 23 January: Koichi Sekimoto, Japanese footballer (born 1978)
 24 January: Eric Webster, English footballer (born 1931)
 26 January: Ray Pointer, English footballer (born 1936)
 27 January:
 Peter Baker, English footballer (born 1931)
 Tommy O'Hara, Scottish footballer (born 1952)
 28 January:
 Dave Thomson, Scottish footballer (born 1938)
 Ladislav Totkovič, Slovak footballer (born 1962)
 30 January: Peter Quinn, Irish Gaelic footballer (born 1925)

February

 1 February:
 Ali Beratlıgil, 84, Turkish football player and coach.
 Miguel Gutiérrez, 84, Mexican footballer (Club Atlas).
 3 February:
 Mark Farren, Irish footballer (born 1982)
 Suat Mamat, Turkish international footballer (born 1930)
 4 February:
 Harry Glasgow, Scottish footballer (born 1939)
 David Sloan, Northern Irish international footballer (born 1941)
 9 February: Graham Moore, Welsh footballer (born 1941)
 10 February:
 Leo Ehlen, Dutch footballer (born 1953)
 Anatoli Ilyin, Soviet Russian footballer (born 1931)
 Eliseo Prado, Argentine international footballer (born 1929)
 Günter Schröter, East German international footballer (born 1927)
 11 February:
 Juan Mujica, Uruguayan international footballer and manager (born 1943)
 Ferenc Rudas, Hungarian footballer (born 1921)
 12 February: Hugo Tassara, Chilean football manager (born 1924)
 13 February:
 Trifon Ivanov, Bulgarian international footballer (born 1965)
 Giorgio Rossano, Italian footballer (born 1939)
 Slobodan Santrač, Yugoslavian international footballer and manager (born 1946)
 15 February:
 Paul Bannon, Irish footballer (born 1956)
 Hans Posthumus, Dutch footballer (born 1947)
 16 February: Ronnie Blackman, English footballer (born 1925)
 18 February:
 Johnny Miller, English footballer (born 1950)
 Don Rossiter, English footballer (born 1935)
 Giorgio Tinazzi, Italian footballer (born 1934)
 19 February:
 Din Joe Crowley, Irish Gaelic footballer (born 1945)
 Freddie Goodwin, English footballer (born 1933)
 20 February:
 Muhamed Mujić, Bosnian footballer (born 1933)
 Nando Yosu, Spanish footballer (born 1939)
 24 February: Rafael Iriondo, Spanish international footballer and manager (born 1918)
 28 February: Raúl Sánchez, Chilean international footballer (born 1933)
 29 February:
 Hannes Löhr, German international footballer and coach (born 1942)
 José Parra Martínez, Spanish footballer (born 1925)

March

 1 March: Ítalo Estupiñán, Ecuadorian international footballer (born 1952)
 2 March: Allan Michaelsen, Danish international footballer (born 1947)
 4 March: Yuri Kuznetsov, Soviet international footballer (born 1931)
 5 March: Even Hansen, Norwegian footballer (born 1923)
 6 March: Wally Bragg, English footballer (born 1929)
 7 March: Béla Kuharszki, Hungarian footballer (born 1940)
 10 March: Roberto Perfumo, Argentine international footballer (born 1942)
 11 March: Billy Ritchie, Serbian footballer (born 1936)
 13 March: József Verebes, Hungarian footballer (born 1941)
 14 March: Davy Walsh, Irish footballer (born 1923)
 15 March:
 John Ene Okon, Nigerian footballer (born 1969)
 Vladimir Yurin, Russian footballer (born 1947)
 16 March:
 Brian Smyth, Irish Gaelic footballer (born 1924)
 Alan Spavin, English footballer (born 1942)
 19 March:
 José Artetxe, Spanish international footballer (born 1930)
 Jack Mansell, English footballer (born 1927)
 21 March: Jean Cornelis, Belgian international footballer (born 1941)
 24 March:
 Johan Cruyff, Dutch international footballer and manager (born 1947)
 Proloy Saha, Indian footballer
 Brendan Sloan, Northern Irish Gaelic footballer (born 1948)
 25 March: Raúl Cárdenas, Mexican international footballer (born 1928)
 26 March: Paddy O'Brien, Irish Gaelic footballer
 27 March:
 Abel Dhaira, Ugandan international footballer (born 1987)
 Silvio Fogel, Argentine footballer (born 1949)
 29 March: Maxime Camara, Guinean football midfielder (born 1943)
 30 March: John King, English footballer (born 1938)
 31 March:
 Aníbal Alzate, Colombian footballer (born 1933)
 Ian Britton, Scottish footballer (born 1954)
 Amaury Epaminondas, Brazilian footballer (born 1935)

April

 2 April:
 Sergio Ferrari, Italian footballer (born 1943)
 Nabil Nosair, Egyptian footballer (born 1938)
 László Sárosi, Hungarian international footballer (born 1932) 
 3 April:
 Cesare Maldini, Italian international footballer (born 1932)
 John Waite, English footballer (born 1942)
 4 April:
 Georgi Hristakiev, Bulgarian international footballer (born 1944)
 Ken Waterhouse, English footballer (born 1930)
 5 April: Koço Kasapoğlu, Turkish footballer (born 1936)
 6 April:
 Bernd Hoss, German footballer (born 1939)
 Garry Jones, English footballer (born 1950)
 8 April: Fred Middleton, English footballer (born 1930)
 12 April:
 Aquilino Bonfanti, Italian footballer (born 1943)
 Pedro de Felipe, Spanish footballer (born 1944)
 16 April: Louis Pilot, Luxembourgian footballer (born 1940)
 18 April: Fritz Herkenrath, German international goalkeeper (born 1928)
 19 April:
 Mehrdad Oladi, Iranian footballer (born 1985)
 Igor Volchok, Russian footballer (born 1931)
 22 April: John Lumsden, Scottish footballer (born 1950)
 25 April: Dumitru Antonescu, Romanian international footballer (born 1945)
 26 April: Vladimir Yulygin, Russian footballer (born 1936)
 28 April: Óscar Marcelino Álvarez, Argentine footballer (born 1948)

May

 6 May:
 Nico de Bree, Dutch footballer (born 1944)
 Larry Pinto de Faria, Brazilian footballer (born 1932)
 Valeriy Zuyev, Ukrainian footballer (born 1952)
 7 May:
 José Roberto Marques, Brazilian footballer (born 1945)
 George Ross, Scottish footballer (born 1943)
 8 May: Wolfgang Patzke, German footballer (born 1959)
 7 May: Chris Mitchell, Scottish footballer (born 1988)
 13 May: Engelbert Kraus, German international footballer (born 1934)
 18 May: Zygmunt Kukla, Polish international footballer (born 1948)
 25 May: Ian Gibson, Scottish footballer (born 1943)
 26 May:
 Esad Čolaković, Macedonian footballer (born 1970)
 Ted Dumitru, Romanian football manager (born 1939)
 27 May:
 Gerhard Harpers, German international footballer (born 1928)
 František Jakubec, Czech international footballer (born 1956)
 30 May: Jan Aas, Norwegian footballer (born 1944)

June

 2 June:
 Yevhen Lemeshko, Ukrainian footballer (born 1930)
 Abderrahmane Meziani, Algerian footballer (born 1942)
 4 June:
 István Halász, Hungarian international footballer (born 1951)
 Nicky Jennings, English footballer (born 1946)
 6 June: Harry Gregory, English footballer (born 1943)
 7 June:
 Børge Bach, Danish international footballer (born 1945)
 Johnny Brooks, English footballer (born 1931)
 Stephen Keshi, Nigerian international footballer (born 1962)
 Didargylyç Urazow, Turkmen footballer (born 1977)
 10 June:
 Shuaibu Amodu, Nigerian footballer (born 1958)
 Alex Govan, Scottish footballer (born 1929)
 Ambrose Hickey, Irish Gaelic footballer (born 1945)
 Giuseppe Virgili, Italian international footballer (born 1935)
 12 June: Alfonso Portugal, Mexican international footballer (born 1934)
 13 June:
 Uriah Asante, Ghanaian footballer (born 1992)
 Tony Byrne, Irish footballer (born 1946)
 16 June: Luděk Macela, Czech international footballer (born 1950)
 20 June:
 Eamonn Dolan, Irish footballer (born 1967)
 Willie Logie, Scottish footballer (born 1932)
 21 June: Bryan Edwards, English footballer (born 1930)
 22 June: Tokia Russell, Bermudian footballer (born 1977)
 27 June: Luís Carlos Melo Lopes, Brazilian footballer (born 1954)

July

 1 July: Jerzy Patoła, Polish footballer (born 1946)
 3 July:
 Jimmy Frizzell, Scottish footballer (born 1937)
 John Middleton, English footballer (born 1956)
 4 July: Ben Koufie, Ghanaian footballer (born 1932)
 5 July: Mick Finucane, Irish Gaelic footballer (born 1922)
 6 July: Turgay Şeren, Turkish international footballer (born 1932)
 7 July: John O'Rourke, English footballer (born 1945)
 8 July: Jackie McInally, Scottish footballer (born 1936)
 9 July: Erny Brenner, Luxembourgian footballer (born 1931)
 10 July:
 Amal Dutta, Indian footballer (born 1930)
 Anatoli Isayev, Soviet footballer (born 1932)
 David Stride, English footballer (born 1958)
 11 July: Kurt Svensson, Swedish footballer (born 1927)
 13 July: George Allen, English footballer (born 1932)
 16 July: Oleg Syrokvashko, Belarusian footballer (born 1961)
 18 July:
 John Hope, English footballer (born 1949)
 Heinz Lucas, German footballer (born 1920)
 19 July: Tom McCready, Scottish footballer (born 1943)
 23 July:
 Boy-Boy Mosia, South African footballer (born 1985)
 Peter Wenger, Swiss footballer (born 1944)
 24 July:
 Marto Gracias, Indian footballer
 Ian King, Scottish footballer (born 1937)
 25 July:
 Artur Correia, Portuguese footballer (born 1950)
 Bülent Eken, Turkish footballer (born 1923)
 26 July: Dave Syrett, English footballer (born 1956)
 27 July: Máximo Mosquera, Peruvian footballer (born 1928)
 28 July: Vladica Kovačević, Serbian footballer (born 1940)

August

 2 August: Neil Wilkinson, English footballer (born 1955)
 4 August: Charles Toubé, Cameroonian footballer (born 1958)
 5 August: Joe Davis, Scottish footballer (born 1941)
 6 August: Mel Slack, English footballer (born 1944)
 7 August: Roy Summersby, English footballer (born 1935)
 9 August: Karl Bögelein, German international footballer and coach (born 1927)
 13 August: Liam Tuohy, English footballer (born 1933)
 15 August: Dalian Atkinson, English footballer (born 1968)
 20 August: Rab Stewart, English footballer (born 1962)
 26 August:
 Anton Pronk, Dutch international footballer (born 1941)
 Jiří Tichý, Czech footballer (born 1933)
 27 August:
 Alcindo, Brazilian footballer (born 1945)
 Alan Smith, English footballer (born 1939)
 29 August:
 Reg Matthewson, English footballer (born 1939)
 Anne O'Brien, Irish footballer (born 1956)
 30 August:
 Josip Bukal, Bosnian footballer (born 1945)
 Dave Durie, English footballer (born 1931)

September

 3 September: Jan Nilsen, Norwegian footballer (born 1937)
 4 September: Zvonko Ivezić, Serbian footballer (born 1949)
 5 September:
 Jaroslav Jareš, Czech footballer (born 1930)
 George McLeod, Scottish footballer (born 1932)
 6 September: Dave Pacey, English footballer (born 1936)
 8 September: Bert Llewellyn, English footballer (born 1939)
 9 September:
 Sylvia Gore, English footballer (born 1944)
 James Siang'a, Kenyan footballer
 11 September: Ben Idrissa Dermé, Burkinabe footballer (born 1982)
 13 September:
 Denis Atkins, English footballer (born 1938)
 Ottavio Bugatti, Italian footballer (born 1928)
 Matt Gray, Scottish footballer (born 1936)
 15 September: Greg Maher, Irish Gaelic footballer (born 1967)
 17 September: Sigge Parling, Swedish international footballer (born 1930)
 20 September: Alan Cousin, Scottish footballer (born 1938)
 21 September: Mahmadu Alphajor Bah, Sierra Leonean footballer (born 1977)
 23 September:
 Marcel Artelesa, French international footballer (born 1938)
 Yngve Brodd, Swedish footballer (born 1930)
 David Coleman, English footballer (born 1942)
 24 September: Mel Charles, Welsh international footballer (born 1935)
 26 September: Jackie Sewell, English footballer (born 1927)
 27 September: Serigne Abdou Thiam, Qatari footballer (born 1995)
 28 September:
 Seamus Dunne, Irish footballer (born 1930)
 Werner Friese, German footballer (born 1946)
 Graham Hawkins, English footballer (born 1946)
 29 September: Herbert Martin, German footballer (born 1925)
 30 September: Paul Frantz, French footballer (born 1927)

October

 1 October:
 David Herd, Scottish international footballer (born 1934)
 Erol Keskin, Turkish international footballer (born 1927)
 Vittorio Scantamburlo, Italian football manager (born 1930)
 3 October: Mário Wilson, Portuguese football central defender (born 1929)
 4 October: Fred Osam-Duodu, Ghanaian football manager (born 1938)
 6 October: Peter Denton, English footballer (born 1946)
 7 October: Gonzalo Peralta, Argentine footballer (born 1980)
 8 October: Guillaume Bieganski, French international footballer (born 1932)
 10 October:
 Gerry Gow, Scottish footballer (born 1952)
 Eddie O'Hara, Scottish footballer (born 1935)
 12 October: Shahlyla Baloch, Pakistani footballer (born 1996)
 13 October: Primo Sentimenti, Italian footballer (born 1926)
 14 October: Aleksandr Syomin, Soviet footballer (born 1943)
 15 October: Per Rune Wølner, Norwegian footballer (born 1949)
 16 October: George Peebles, Scottish footballer (born 1936)
 17 October: Rémy Vogel, French international footballer (born 1960)
 18 October: Gary Sprake, Welsh international footballer (born 1945)
 19 October:
 Safet Berisha, Albanian international footballer (born 1949)
 Luis María Echeberría, Spanish footballer (born 1940)
 Sammy Smyth, Northern Irish footballer (born 1925)
 20 October: Uwe Dreher, German footballer (born 1960)
 21 October: Constantin Frățilă, Romanian international footballer (born 1942)
 24 October: Reinhard Häfner, German international footballer (born 1952)
 25 October:
 Bjørn Lidin Hansen, Norwegian footballer (born 1989)
 Carlos Alberto Torres, Brazilian international footballer (born 1944)
 26 October: Ali Hussein Shihab, Iraqi international footballer (born 1961)
 27 October:
 Brian Hill, English footballer (born 1941)
 Fatim Jawara, Gambian footballer (born 1997)
 31 October: Ray Mabbutt, English footballer (born 1936)

November

 1 November: Sverre Andersen, Norwegian international footballer (born 1936)
 2 November: Martin Lippens, Belgian international footballer (born 1934)
 4 November: Mansour Pourheidari, Iranian international footballer, coach and manager (born 1946)
 6 November: Mick Granger, English footballer (born 1931)
 7 November:
 Thomas Gardner, English footballer (born 1923)
 Eric Murray, English footballer (born 1941)
 8 November: Kazimír Gajdoš, Czechoslovakian international footballer (born 1934)
 9 November: Emmanuel Kwasi Afranie, Ghanaian footballer (born 1943)
 11 November:
 Uwe Bracht, German footballer (born 1953)
 Željko Čajkovski, Croatian international footballer and coach (born 1925)
 Alfred Schmidt, German international footballer and manager (born 1935)
 12 November: Adolf Kunstwadl, German footballer (born 1940)
 13 November: Laurent Pokou, Ivorian international footballer (born 1947)
 15 November: Bobby Campbell, Northern Irish footballer (born 1956)
 16 November:
 Len Allchurch, Welsh international footballer (born 1933)
 Daniel Prodan, Romanian international footballer (born 1972)
 18 November: Armando Tobar, Chilean international footballer (born 1938)
 19 November: Christian Salaba, Austrian footballer (born 1971)
 20 November: Gabriel Badilla, Costa Rican international footballer (born 1984)
 21 November: René Vignal, French footballer (born 1926)
 23 November: Joe Lennon, Northern Irish Gaelic football manager (born 1934)
 24 November: Paul Futcher, English footballer (born 1956)
 25 November: Jim Gillespie, Scottish footballer (born 1947)
 26 November: David Provan, Scottish footballer (born 1941)
 27 November: Lim Chiew Peng, Singaporean footballer
 28 November: Victims of the Chapecoense disaster:
 Victorino Chermont, Brazilian sportscaster (born 1973)
 Paulo Julio Clement, Brazilian sportscaster (born 1964)
 Caio Júnior, Brazilian player and manager (born 1965)
 Delfim Peixoto, Brazilian football administrator (born 1941)
 Mário Sérgio Pontes de Paiva, Brazilian international footballer and manager (born 1950)
 29 November: Norman Oakley, English footballer (born 1939)

December

 2 December: Dejo Fayemi, Nigerian international footballer (born 1933)
 3 December: Willie Casey, Irish Gaelic footballer (born 1952)
 6 December: Dave MacLaren, Scottish footballer (born 1934)
 7 December:
 Brian Bulless, English footballer (born 1933)
 Ian Cartwright, English footballer (born 1964)
 Sergei Razaryonov, Russian footballer (born 1955)
 9 December: Sergei Lemeshko, Russian footballer (born 1972)
 10 December:
 Peter Brabrook, English international footballer (born 1937)
 Tımmy McCulloch, Scottish footballer (born 1934)
 Luciano Nobili, Italian footballer (born 1933)
 11 December: Charlie McNeil, Scottish footballer (born 1963)
 14 December: Fosco Becattini, Italian footballer (born 1925)
 15 December: Albert Bennett, English footballer (born 1944)
 18 December: Eddie Bailham, Irish footballer (born 1941)
 19 December:
 Ger Blok, Dutch football manager (born 1939)
 Fidel Uriarte, Spanish international footballer (born 1945)
 21 December: Şehmus Özer, Turkish footballer (born 1980)
 23 December: Poul Pedersen, Danish footballer (born 1932)
 26 December: Martin Reagan, English footballer (born 1924)
 28 December: Edgar Robles, Paraguayan footballer (born 1977)
 29 December:
 Matt Carragher, English footballer (born 1976)
 Uzama Douglas, Nigerian footballer (born 1988)
 Norman Rimmington, English footballer (born 1923)
 Lucien Schaeffer, French footballer (born 1928)
 30 December: Ad-Diba, Egyptian footballer (born 1927)

References

External links 

 
Association football by year